The 1926 New Mexico gubernatorial election was held on November 2, 1926. Incumbent Democratic Governor Arthur T. Hannett was defeated by Republican nominee Richard C. Dillon who won 51.60% of the vote.

General election

Candidates
Arthur T. Hannett, Democratic, incumbent Governor
Richard C. Dillon, Republican, State Senator

Results

References

Bibliography
 
 

1926
New Mexico
Gubernatorial
November 1926 events